Artem Igorevich Maltsev (born 24 May 1993) is a Russian cross-country skier.

Cross-country skiing results
All results are sourced from the International Ski Federation (FIS).

Olympic Games

Distance reduced to 30 km due to weather conditions.

World Championships
 1 medal – (1 silver)

World Cup

Season standings

Individual podiums
 3 podiums – (2 , 1 )

Team podiums
 1 victory – (1 )
 4 podiums – (2 , 2 )

Notes

References

External links

1993 births
Living people
Russian male cross-country skiers
Tour de Ski skiers
FIS Nordic World Ski Championships medalists in cross-country skiing
Sportspeople from Nizhny Novgorod
Cross-country skiers at the 2022 Winter Olympics
Olympic cross-country skiers of Russia